Jorge Vásquez (born 29 July 1937) is a Peruvian footballer. He played in one match for the Peru national football team in 1963. He was also part of Peru's squad for the 1963 South American Championship.

References

1937 births
Living people
Peruvian footballers
Peru international footballers
Association football forwards
People from Trujillo Province, Peru